Gentil Ferreira Viana (2 June 1935 – 23 February 2008) founded, among others separatist leaders, the Popular Movement for the Liberation of Angola (MPLA). In 1974, he and Joaquim Pinto de Andrade broke away from the MPLA and formed the Activa Revolt; the two men died on the same day in 2008.

References

1930s births
2008 deaths
Angolan communists
MPLA politicians
Angolan independence activists